Peter Jackisch (born 21 November 1963) is a retired German football defender.

References

External links
 

1963 births
Living people
German footballers
Bundesliga players
2. Bundesliga players
VfB Remscheid players
VfL Bochum players
Alemannia Aachen players
Place of birth missing (living people)
Association football defenders